The 1989 National Rowing Championships was the 18th edition of the National Championships, held from 14–16 July 1989 at the Strathclyde Country Park in Motherwell, North Lanarkshire.

Senior

Medal summary

Lightweight

Medal summary

Junior

Medal summary

Coastal

Medal summary 

Key

References 

British Rowing Championships
British Rowing Championships
British Rowing Championships